Fuse ("The Fire is Burning") is a Bosnian comedy/drama film directed by Pjer Žalica. It was released in 2003.

Synopsis
The plot takes place in the small town of Tešanj in the Federation of Bosnia and Herzegovina, two years after the Bosnian War. The town is overridden by corruption, prostitution and organized crime. People of Tešanj live in peace, though the war scars are visible everywhere in town, as well as in people's souls. After the war, the population of Tešanj consists almost exclusively of Bosniaks. Ethnic Serbs now live in surrounding villages.

It is announced that U.S. president Bill Clinton will pay a visit to the town. Western bureaucrats arrive to Tešanj to supervise the preparations for the visit. Everything in the town must be in order, including the faked brotherhood between Bosniaks and Serbs.

Cast
 Enis Bešlagić - Faruk
 Bogdan Diklić - Zaim
 Saša Petrović - Husnija
 Izudin Bajrović - Mugdim
 Emir Hadžihafizbegović - Stanko
 Jasna Žalica - Hitka
 Senad Bašić - Velija
 Feđa Štukan - Adnan
 Hubert Kramar - Supervisor
 Admir Glamočak - Hamdo
 Aleksandar Seksan - Pic
 Almir Čehajić - Osman
 Alban Ukaj - Glavar

Soundtrack
Bosnian folk singer Emina Zečaj recorded music for the film.

Awards
 Silver Leopard, Locarno International Film Festival - 2003
 Golden Star, Marrakech International Film Festival - 2003
 Best First Feature, Sarajevo Film Festival - 2003

References

External links
 Official website
 

2003 films
Bosnia and Herzegovina war films
Bosnian-language films
Bosnian War films
Films set in Bosnia and Herzegovina
Heart of Sarajevo Award for Best Film winners
Yugoslav Wars in fiction
Bosnia and Herzegovina comedy films
Bosnia and Herzegovina drama films